The naming law in Sweden
is a Swedish law which requires the approval of the government agency for names to be given to Swedish children. The parents must submit the proposed name of a child within three months of birth. The current law was enacted in 2017, replacing a 1982 law. The Swedish Tax Agency administers the registration of names in Sweden. The law has been revised since originally enacted; in 1983, it was made possible for a man to adopt his wife's or partner's name, as well as for a woman to adopt her husband's name.

The 1982 law states, in part: "First names shall not be approved if they can cause offense or can be supposed to cause discomfort for the one using it, or names which for some obvious reason are not suitable as a first name" (§ 34). This text applies both when parents name their children and when an adult wants to change their own name. When changing a name, the first change is free of charge as long as at least one of the names given at birth is kept, and such a change is only allowed once per person. Further name changes require fee payment. The law states nothing about registering which name is used on a daily basis, but the tax authority can register that if requested.

History 
The first real national legislation on family names was the Name Ordinance of December 5, 1901, primarily meant to prevent non-noble families from giving their children the names of noble families. The Ordinance was revised in 1919, 1920, 1921, 1922, 1931, 1946 and 1962. The Ordinance was followed by the Names Act of 1963, which went into full legal effect on January 1, 1964. This name law was followed by the Names Act of 1982, which went into full legal effect on January 1, 1983. In 2001, the Swedish parliament, the Riksdag, called upon the government to take action on a new naming law, but without any result. On December 21, 2009, the Swedish government appointed a special investigative committee to suggest how a new naming law should be constituted. The committee's final report was made public in May 2013. Then, after some bureaucratic wrangling, the Swedish Government proposed a naming law bill to the Riksdag, which approved the proposal, to take full and legal effect on July 1st, 2017.

Protest names 
There has been some controversy surrounding Sweden's naming laws since they have been enacted. Aside from significant commentary in the press, many parents have attempted to give their children unusual names.

Brfxxccxxmnpcccclllmmnprxvclmnckssqlbb11116
Brfxxccxxmnpcccclllmmnprxvclmnckssqlbb11116, ostensibly pronounced  ("Albin"), is a name intended for a Swedish child who was born in 1991. Parents Elisabeth Hallin and Lasse Diding gave their child this name to protest a fine, imposed in accordance with the naming law in Sweden.

Because the parents had failed to register a name by the boy's fifth birthday, a district court in Halmstad, southern Sweden, fined them 5,000 kronor (roughly US$740 at the time and ). Responding to the fine, the parents submitted the 43-character name in May 1996, claiming that it was "a pregnant, expressionistic development that we see as an artistic creation". The parents suggested that the name be understood in the spirit of pataphysics. The court rejected the name and upheld the fine.

The parents then tried to change the spelling of the name to A (also pronounced ). Once again, the court refused to approve of the name due to a prohibition of one-letter names. After this rejection, the last resort for them is naming the child Albin Gustaf Tarzan Hallin, which was eventually accepted.

Metallica 
In 2007, Michael and Karolina Tomaro fought to have their daughter named "Metallica", after  the band. Tax officials determined that the name was "inappropriate", but the Göteborg County Administrative Court ruled in March 2007 that there was no reason to block the name, stating that a Swedish woman already uses the middle name Metallica. Tax officials did not agree with the decision and denied the parents a passport for their daughter, but later withdrew the objection.

Commentary at the time noted that the name "Google" was earlier deemed acceptable in 2005, when Elias and Carol Kai named their child "Oliver Google Kai."

Allah 
In 2009, the Swedish Tax Authority refused to allow a couple to name their son "Allah". The basis of the decision was that the name could be seen as objectionable for religious reasons, and that some people might take offense at such a name.

As of 31 December 2018, 245 people living in Sweden had Allah as a first name (or middle name), and three people in Sweden had Allah as surname.

See also 
 Naming law
 Naming laws in the People's Republic of China, for similar cases in China
 Swedish nobility
 Hubert Blaine Wolfeschlegelsteinhausenbergerdorff Sr., an American typesetter (born in Germany) whose full name was 746 letters long

References

Further reading

External links 
 - Paragraph about offensive and unsuitable given names.

 
'Pataphysics
Naming
1982 in law
1982 in Sweden